Roman Berdnikov (born July 18, 1992) is a Russian professional ice hockey player. He is currently playing with Severstal Cherepovets of the Kontinental Hockey League (KHL).

Berdnikov made his Kontinental Hockey League debut playing with Avangard Omsk during the 2011–12 KHL season.

References

External links

1992 births
Living people
Avangard Omsk players
Metallurg Novokuznetsk players
Owen Sound Attack players
Russian ice hockey forwards
Severstal Cherepovets players
Sportspeople from Omsk